Carlo Ilari (born 12 December 1991) is an Italian professional footballer who plays as a midfielder for  club Lecco.

Club career
On 4 July 2019, he returned to Teramo after one season away, signing a 2-year contract.

On 16 July 2021, he signed a two-year contract with Cesena.

On 12 July 2022, Ilari moved to Lecco on a two-year contract.

References

External links

calciatori.com
goal.com

Living people
1991 births
Sportspeople from Ancona
Italian footballers
Association football midfielders
Serie A players
Serie B players
Serie C players
Ascoli Calcio 1898 F.C. players
Juventus F.C. players
FeralpiSalò players
A.S.D. Barletta 1922 players
U.S. Catanzaro 1929 players
Santarcangelo Calcio players
S.S. Teramo Calcio players
A.S. Sambenedettese players
Cesena F.C. players
Calcio Lecco 1912 players
Italy youth international footballers
Footballers from Marche